Kadir Seven (born 5 May 2003) is a Turkish professional footballer who plays as a centre-back for Giresunspor.

Professional career
A youth product of Kardemir Karabükspor and 5000 Evlerspor, Seven began his senior career in amateur football with Orduspor 1967 in 2021 helping them get promoted into the TFF Third League, and quickly gained attention for his play. On 1 July 2022, he transferred to Giresunspor. He made his senior and professional debut with Giresunspor as a late substitute in a 1–0 Süper Lig win over Kasımpaşa on 20 August 2022.

References

External links
 
 

2003 births
Living people
People from Karabük
Turkish footballers
Giresunspor footballers
Süper Lig players
TFF Third League players
Association football defenders